The phrase "violence begets violence" (or "hate begets hate") means that violent behaviour promotes other violent behaviour, in return. The phrase has been used since the early 19th century.

Violence begets violence is a concept described in the Gospel of Matthew, verse 26:52. The passage depicts a disciple (identified in the Gospel of John as  Peter) drawing a sword to defend against the arrest of Jesus but being told to sheath his weapon:

"Put your sword back in its place," Jesus said to him, "for all who draw the sword will die by the sword."

Words by Martin Luther King Jr. 
Martin Luther King Jr. (1929–1968) used the phrase when saying:

See also
 Christian anarchism
 Cycle of violence
 Turning the other cheek

References

Martin Luther King Jr.
Christian nonviolence
Violence
Causality